Ioannis Persakis (1877 – 1943) was a Greek athlete.  He competed at the 1896 Summer Olympics in Athens. He was born in Athens. Persakis competed in the triple jump, taking third place.  His best jump was 12.52 metres.

References

External links

1877 births
1943 deaths
Greek male triple jumpers
Olympic athletes of Greece
Athletes (track and field) at the 1896 Summer Olympics
19th-century sportsmen
Olympic bronze medalists for Greece
Medalists at the 1896 Summer Olympics
Olympic bronze medalists in athletics (track and field)
Athletes from Athens
Date of birth missing
Date of death missing
Place of death missing